The women's hammer throw event at the 1998 Commonwealth Games was held on 16 September in Kuala Lumpur.

This was the first time that this event was contested at the Commonwealth Games.

Results

References

Hammer
1998
1998 in women's athletics